Winterfylleth is an English black metal band from Manchester. Since their inception in 2006, the band has released seven studio albums and have become a popular act in both the English underground metal scene and the wider international metal arena. Winterfylleth are self-described as "English Heritage Black Metal" and is often considered to be musical 'brothers-in-arms' with fellow English black metal band Wodensthrone owing to the common lyrical and aesthetic themes they share. The band takes its name from the Old English word 'Winterfylleth', which translates into modern English as 'Winter Full Moon' and is signified by the arrival of the first full moon of winter.

History
Formed in 2006, and releasing a demo (Rising of the Winter Full Moon) in 2007, Winterfylleth rapidly gained attention in the metal underground, earning them a record deal with Profound Lore Records on which they released their debut 2008 album The Ghost of Heritage. The release was critically well received and garnered the band considerable attention within the English black metal scene. Following this release, Richard Brass (also a member of Wodensthrone) departed the band and Chris Naughton and Simon Lucas were joined by Nick Wallwork and Mark Wood, completing the line-up that would remain until 2015. During the period between their first and second albums, white supremacist slogans were discovered on the bassist's MySpace page. This led to the band being removed from the lineup for a festival in Manchester and the bassist's departure from the band. Winterfylleth then set to work on their second album, The Mercian Sphere, which was released on Candlelight Records in 2010. Again, the release was a critical success (Terrorizer magazine album of the month and twentieth best album of 2010) and propelled the band to international success. This new found recognition landed the band high-profile appearances at a number of top metal festivals including Wacken Open Air, Hellfest, Graspop and Bloodstock Open Air. Winterfylleth released their third album in 2012, The Threnody of Triumph, once again to widespread critical acclaim: this release again obtaining Terrorizer magazine's album of the month and 15th best album of 2012. It also was ranked as the 12th best album of 2012 by Kerrang! and made the top ten lists of many Kerrang! contributors that year as well.

In March and April 2013, Winterfylleth toured with and supported Enslaved in seventeen shows out of their eighteen show Spring Rite European tour. Later in the year the band returned to Graspop Metal Meeting for the second year running and soon after made their Summer Breeze Open Air debut. The first half of 2014 saw two releases from Winterfylleth. The first, released in January, was a split EP on vinyl with Ukrainian black metal band Drudkh entitled Thousands of Moons Ago / The Gates which featured covers of bands that have influenced Winterfylleth and Drudkh. The second, released in May, was a compilation album in which Winterfylleth participated entitled One And All, Together, For Home, featuring folk songs recorded by various metal bands including Primordial, Kampfar and, once again, Drudkh. In July 2014 Winterfylleth announced that they planned to release their fourth album, The Divination of Antiquity, in October 2014.

In 2015, they received the award for "best underground band" at the Metal Hammer Golden Gods Awards. On 2 August 2016 the band announced the album cover and title of their fifth album, The Dark Hereafter. On 4 August, they confirmed the release date as 30 September. They released the track 'Ensigns of Victory' in advance of the album's release. The band released their sixth album titled The Hallowing of Heirdom on 6 April 2018. The band released their seventh album, The Reckoning Dawn, on 8 May 2020. Metal Hammer named it as the 28th best metal album of 2020. Metal Hammer Germany voted the album as the #1 Black Metal album of 2020.

Discography

Studio albums
The Ghost of Heritage (2008)
The Mercian Sphere (2010)
The Threnody of Triumph (2012)
The Divination of Antiquity (2014)
The Dark Hereafter (2016)
The Hallowing of Heirdom (2018)
The Reckoning Dawn (2020)

Demos
 Rising of the Winter Full Moon (2007)

Splits
Thousands of Moons Ago / The Gates (2014, with Drudkh)

7" singles
Latch to a Grave (2018)

Compilations
One And All, Together, For Home (2014)

Live albums
The Siege of Mercia; Live at Bloodstock 2017 (2019)

Live at Bloodstock 2021; Live at Bloodstock Festival 2021 (2021)

Chart positions (The Reckoning Dawn)

Members

Current
 Chris Naughton – guitars, lead vocals (2006–present)
 Simon Lucas – drums (2006–present)
 Nick Wallwork – bass, backing vocals (2009–present)
 Mark Deeks - keyboards, backing vocals (2014–present)
 Russell Dobson - lead guitar, backing vocals (2020–present)

Former
 Richard Brass – guitars, backing vocals  (2008–2009)
 Mark Wood – guitars, backing vocals (2009–2014)
 Dan Capp – guitars, backing vocals (2014–2020)

References

External links

2007 establishments in England
English black metal musical groups
Musical groups established in 2007
Musical groups from Manchester
Candlelight Records artists
Profound Lore Records artists